Zanclarches is a monotypic moth genus in the family Cosmopterigidae described by Edward Meyrick in 1921. Its only species, Zanclarches fastosa, described by the same author in the same year, is found on Java in Indonesia.

References

External links

Cosmopterigidae